Nana Mizuki Live Skipper Countdown the DVD and More is the 2nd live DVD release from J-pop star and voice actress Nana Mizuki. It has two discs, Skipper Disc and Document Disc.

Skipper Disc

Contains 6th concert Live Skipper Countdown 2003-2004 held on 31 December 2003 at Makuhari Messe Event Hall. Most songs performed were from her third album Dream Skipper.

 OPENING
 What cheer？
 Keep your hands in the air
 
 White Lie
 Transmigration
 MC1
 Dear to me
 Looking on the moon
 
 Through the night
 Still in the groove
 MC2 ~COUNTDOWN~
 New Sensation
 Nocturne ‐revision‐
 Jet Park
 
 
 MC3
 Be Ready！
 Protection
 
 MC4 encore
 Refrain ‐classico‐
 Power Gate
 Encore:  ～a cappella～

Document Disc

Contains digested footage of her Summer tour Nana Mizuki Live Sensation 2003 (5th tour) and special features. Most songs were from her singles.

Transmigration
Honey Flower
The place of happiness
 

Heaven Knows

Supersonic Girl
New Sensation

Special features

Time to Live Skipper Countdown
For My Treasure

External links
 Information on official website

Nana Mizuki video albums
Live video albums
2004 video albums